Pearl Diver (1944–1971) was a French Thoroughbred racehorse which won the Derby in 1947.

Pearl Diver or Pearl Divers may also refer to:

Pearl diver, one who recovers pearls from wild molluscs.


Books
Pearl Diver, a 1930 biography of pioneering diver Victor Berge (1891–1974)
The Pearl Diver, a 2004 novel by Sujata Massey

Film

 Sisid (TV series)  (International title: Pearl Diver), a Philippine underwater action drama
 Pearl Diver, a film which won 2005 award at Indianapolis International Film Festival

Music
The Pearl Diver: A Japanese Legend (Ship At Sea), a 2016 violin composition and single by Edward W. Hardy
Les pêcheurs de perles (The Pearl Fishers) opera by Bizet

Other uses
Dead Pearl Diver, a sculpture by Benjamin Paul Akers
Pearl Diver, one of the LNER Peppercorn Class A2 steam locomotives named in 1948
The pearl diver cocktail, a tiki cocktail developed by Donn Beach